Kevin Smith (born 12 May 1957) is a Canadian sailor. He competed at the 1988 Summer Olympics and the 1992 Summer Olympics.

References

External links
 

1957 births
Living people
Canadian male sailors (sport)
Olympic sailors of Canada
Sailors at the 1988 Summer Olympics – Tornado
Sailors at the 1992 Summer Olympics – Tornado
Sportspeople from Etobicoke